This is a list of films which have placed number one at the box office in Australia during 2014. All amounts are in Australian dollars. The list below contains 53 weeks due to the first film gross tracking week of the year ending on January 1, and the last week ending on December 31.

References
Urban Cinefile - Box Office

See also
List of Australian films - Australian films by year
2014 in film

2014
Australia
2014 in Australian cinema